The  Awards (English: Crystal Globe Awards) is a set of awards bestowed by members of the French Press Association recognizing excellence in home art and culture. The annual formal ceremony and dinner at which the awards are presented happens each February.

The 1st  were in 2006 in Paris.

Background 
The "Globe de Cristal Awards" categories are: movies, actors, actresses, theater, concerts, novels, singers, TV series, exhibitions and fashion designers.

Categories

Cinema and television 
Best Film
Best TV movie/TV Series
Best Actor
Best Actress
Best TV Show

Music 
Best Male Singer
Best Female Singer

Scene 
Best Play (Including Dance)
Best Musical Play (Including Opera)
Best One-Man-Show

Literature 
Best Literary Piece

Architecture, paint, sculpture and fashion 
Best Exposition
Best Fashion Designer

Honorary 
Honor Globe (Globe d'Honneur)

Ceremonies

2009 
The ceremony takes place at the Lido and is broadcast live on France 3, February at 11PM

 President of the jury : Jacques Attali

 Honor Globe (Globe d'honneur)
 Roberto Alagna

 Special mention from the jury
 Guillaume Depardieu (posthumous)

 Film/ Television
 Best Film : Mesrine : L'Instinct de mort
 Best actor : Vincent Cassel for Mesrine : L'Instinct de mort
 Best actress : Sylvie Testud for Sagan
 Best TV movie or TV show : Sagan
 Best documentary : 9/3 : Mémoire d'un territoire by Yamina Benguigui Music
 Best female performer : Anaïs Best male performer : Julien Doré Theater
 Best opera dance performance : Blanche-Neige by Angelin Preljocaj Best play : La Vie devant soi, staging by Didier Long at the théâtre de l'Œuvre Best musical : Le Soldat rose by Louis Chedid and Dominique Burgaug Best one-man-show : Valérie Lemercier at the Palace

Literature
 Best novel or essay : Où on va, papa ? by Jean-Louis Fournier Best graphic novel : Une vie de chat by Philippe Geluck Arts
 Best exhibit : Picasso et les Maîtres at the Grand Palais Best architect or designer : Andrée Putman Best fashion designer : Isabelle MarantThe ceremony was replayed in the media especially for its controversy concerning a joke, considered vulgar, by Jean-Luc Delarue.  At the moment he handed Yamina Benguigui her award, he asked the director: "Would you like for me to hold your globe?" adding afterwards "or your globes?" (her wearing a low-cut black dress that showed off part of her chest) along with a grimace. The public services host gave his apologies several days later

 2010 
The ceremony takes place at the Lido and is broadcast live on Virgin 17, February at 8:50PM.

 Chairman of the board : Denis Olivennes
 Masters of ceremony : Anne Roumanoff and Patrick Poivre d'Arvor

 Honor globe (Globe d'honneur)
 Danielle Darrieux
 Crystal nugget  Alain Passard (chef)

 Film
 Best Film : Un prophète by Jacques Audiard Best actor : Tahar Rahim for Un prophète
 Best actress : Isabelle Adjani for La Journée de la jupe
 Best TV movie or TV show : Pigalle, la nuit (Canal+) Best documentary : Apocalypse, la Seconde Guerre mondiale

 Theater
 Best opera dance performance : La Flûte enchantée
 Best play : Des gens by Raymond Depardon and Zabou Breitman at the théâtre du Petit-Montparnasse Best musical : La Mélodie du bonheur  at the théâtre du Châtelet Best one-man-show : Mother Fucker by Florence ForestiMusic
 Best female performer : Olivia Ruiz Best male performer : Benjamin BiolayLiterature
 Best novel : D'autres vies que la mienne by Emmanuel Carrère Best graphic novel : Happy sex by Zep Arts
 Best exhibit : Pierre Soulages at the Centre Georges-Pompidou Bestdesigner, architect or photographer : Philippe Starck Best fashion designer : Stefano Pilati for Yves Saint-Laurent 2011 
The ceremony takes place at the Lido and is retransmitted in almost live recording on France 3, February at 8:45PM

 Chairman of the board : Franz-Olivier Giesbert
 Masters of ceremonies : Yves Lecoq

 Honor globe (Globe d'honneur)
 Pierre Arditi

Film / Television
 Best film : L'Arnacœur by Pascal Chaumeil Best actor : Michael Lonsdale for Des hommes et des dieux
 Best actress : Kristin Scott Thomas for Elle s'appelait Sarah
 Best TV movie or TV show : Carlos by Olivier Assayas Theater
 Best play : Miam-miam by Édouard Baer Best musical : Mamma Mia ! at the théâtre Mogador Best one-man-show :  Dernière avant Vegas by Audrey LamyMusic
 Best female performer : Yael Naïm Best male performer : Ben l'Oncle SoulLiterature
 Best novel or essay : Le Quai de Ouistreham by Florence Aubenas Arts
 Best exhibit : Basquiat at the Musée d'art moderne de la ville de Paris Best fashion designer : Jean-Paul Gaultier 2012 
The ceremony was broadcast live from Lido on France 3, February at 11:40PM.

 Chairman of the board : Nicolas Demorand
 Masters of ceremony : Julien Lepers

 Honor globe (Globe d'honneur)
 Éric Reinhardt

Film / Television
 Best Film : Intouchables by Olivier Nakache and Éric Toledano Best actor : Omar Sy for Intouchables
 Best actress : Karin Viard and Marina Fois for Polisse
 Best TV movie or TV show : Flics by Thierry Petit, Simon Jablonka and Olivier Marchal Theater
 Best play : Un fil à la patte by Georges Feydeau, staging by Jérôme Deschamps at the Comédie-Française Bestmusical : Dracula, l'amour plus fort que la mort, staging by Kamel Ouali at the Palais des Sports de Paris Best one-man-show : Liberté (très) surveillée by Stéphane GuillonMusic
 Best female performer : Izia Best male performer : Louis BertignacLiterature
 Best novel or essay : Tout, tout de suite by Morgan Sportès Arts
 Best exhibit : Exhibitions : L'Invention du sauvage at the musée du quai Branly Best fashion designer : Guillaume Henry for Carven 2013 
The ceremony was broadcast live from Lido on Chérie 25, February at 8:45PM.

 Chairman of the board : Hervé Bourges
 Master of ceremonies : Véronique Mounier and Yves Lecoq

 Honor globe (Globe d'honneur)
 Abdou Diouf

Film/ Television
 Best film :
 Rust and Bone by Jacques Audiard Les Adieux à la reine by Benoît Jacquot
 Amour by Michael Haneke
 Holy Motors by Leos Carax
 Thérèse Desqueyroux by Claude Miller
 Best TV movie or TV show :
 Les Revenants by Fabrice Gobert (Canal+) Bref by Kyan Khojandi (Canal+)
 Engrenages by Alexandra Clert (Canal+)
 Les Hommes de l'ombre by Dan Franck (France 2)
 Kaboul Kitchen by Marc Victor, Allan Mauduit and Jean-Patrick Benes (Canal+)
 Best actor :
 Jérémie Renier for Cloclo
 Gilles Lellouche for Thérèse Desqueyroux
 Vincent Lindon for Quelques heures de printemps
 Matthias Schoenaerts for Rust and Bone
 Jean-Louis Trintignant for Amour
 Best actress :
 Marion Cotillard for Rust and Bone
 Émilie Dequenne for À perdre la raison
 Déborah François for Populaire
 Izïa Higelin for Bad Girl
 Emmanuelle Riva for Amour

 Theater
 Best play :
 Inconnu à cette adresse, staging by Michèle Lévy-Braun at the théâtre Antoine Les Liaisons dangereuses, staging by John Malkovich at the théâtre de l'Atelier
 Le Père, staging by Ladislas Chollat at the théâtre Hébertot
 Race, staging by Pierre Laville at the Comédie des Champs-Élysées
 Un chapeau de paille d'Italie, staging by Giorgio Barberio Corsetti at the Comédie-Française
 Best one-man-show :
 Michael Gregorio for En concerts at the Bataclan Florence Foresti for  Foresti Party at Bercy
 Bérengère Krief at the théâtre du Point-Virgule
 Alex Lutz at the Point-Virgule theater
 Gaspard Proust at the théâtre du Rond-Point
 Best musical :
 1789: Les Amants de la Bastille by Giuliano Peparini, Dove Attia and Albert Cohen at the Palais des Sports de Paris Avenue Q, adaptation by Bruno Gaccio and Dominique Guillo at Bobino
 Billie Holiday by Éric-Emmanuel Schmitt and Viktor Lazlo at the Théâtre Rive Gauche
 Salut les copains by Stéphane Jarny and Pascal Forneri at the Folies Bergère
 Sister Act by Carline Brouwer at the théâtre Mogador

Music
 Best female performer :
 Olivia Ruiz for Le Calme et la Tempête (Polydor) Daphné for Treize chansons by Barbara (Naïve Records)
 Lou Doillon for Places (Universal Music Group)
 Imany for The Shape of a Broken Heart (Think Zik)
 Nolwenn Leroy for Ô filles de l'eau (Universal Music Group)
 Best male performer :
 Raphaël for Super-Welter (EMI Group) Benjamin Biolay for Vengeance (Naïve Records)
 Stephan Eicher for L'Envolée (Disques Barclay)
 Johnny Hallyday for L'Attente (Warner Music Group)
 Sexion d'Assaut for L'Apogée (Wati B)

 Literature
 Best novel or essay :
 Les Pays by Marie-Hélène Lafon (Buchet/Chastel) Les Lisières by Olivier Adam (Flammarion)
 La Liste de mes envies by Grégoire Delacourt (published by Jean-Claude Lattès)
 Les Proies : Dans le harem de Kadhafi by Annick Cojean (published Grasset & Fasquelle)
 La Vérité sur l'affaire Harry Quebert by Joël Dicker (éditions de Fallois)

 Arts
 Meilleur créateur de mode :
 Barbara Bui Barbara Boccara et Sharon Krief
 André Courrèges
 Raf Simons
 Hedi Slimane
 Best exhibit :
 Salvador Dalí at the Centre Georges-Pompidou Adel Abdessemed at the Centre Georges-Pompidou
 Canaletto at the Jacquemart-André museum
 Design en Afrique, s'asseoir, se coucher et rêver at the musée Dapper
 Edward Hopper at the Grand Palais

 2014 
The ceremony is broadcast live from Lido on D17, le March at 10:30PM.  It got together viewers (0.5% on either side of the audience)

 President of the jury : Guillaume Durand
 Master of ceremonies : Valérie Bénaïm

 Honor globe (Globe d'honneur)
Yan Pei-Ming

 Film/ Television
 Best film :
 9 mois ferme by Albert DupontelLes Garçons et Guillaume, à table ! by Guillaume Gallienne
Grand Central by Rebecca Zlotowski
Suzanne by Katell Quillévéré
La Vie d'Adèle by Abdellatif Kechiche
 Best TV movie or TV show :
 Tunnel by Dominik Moll and Ben Richards (Canal+)Fais pas ci, fais pas ça by Anne Giafferi and Thierry Bizot (France 2)
Falco by Clothilde Jamin (TF1)
Tout est bon dans le cochon by Saïda Jawad (France 3)
Un village français by Frédéric Krivine, Philippe Triboit and Emmanuel Daucé (France 5)
 Best actor :
 Guillaume Gallienne for Les Garçons et Guillaume, à table !
Niels Arestrup for Quai d'Orsay
Albert Dupontel for 9 mois ferme
Grégory Gadebois for Mon âme par toi guérie
Fabrice Luchini for Alceste à bicyclette
 Best actress :
 Adèle Exarchopoulos for La Vie d'Adèle
Emmanuelle Seigner for  La Vénus à la fourrure
Sandrine Kiberlain for 9 mois ferme
Bernadette Lafont for Paulette

 Theater
 Best play :
 Nos femmes, staging by Richard Berry at the théâtre de ParisLa Liste de mes envies, staging by Anne Bouvier at the Ciné 13 Théâtre
La Locandiera, staging by Marc Paquien at the théâtre de l'Atelier
Nina, staging by Bernard Murat at the théâtre Édouard VII
Une heure de tranquillité, staging by Ladislas Chollat at the théâtre Antoine
 Best musical :
 Disco, staging by Agnès Boury and Stéphane Laporte at the Folies BergèreAirnadette, staging by Pierre-François Martin-Laval at the Olympia
La Belle et la Bête, staging by Glenn Casale at the théâtre Mogador
My Fair Lady, staging by Robert Carsen at the théâtre du Châtelet
Spamalot, staging by Eric Idle at Bobino
 Best one-man-show :
 Gad Elmaleh for Sans tambour at the théâtre MarignyOlivier de Benoist for Fournisseur d'excès at La Cigale
Bérengère Krief for théâtre du Point-Virgule
Alex Lutz at the Point-Virgule theater
Muriel Robin for  Muriel Robin revient... tsoin tsoin ! (at the Palais des sports

Music
 Best female performer :
 Ayọ for Ticket to the World (Mercury Records)Carla Bruni for Little French Songs (Universal Music Group)
HollySiz for My Name Is (East West)
Vanessa Paradis for Love Songs (Universal Music Group)
Zaz for Recto verso (EMI Group)
 Best male performer :
 Stromae for Racine carrée (Universal Music Group)Bernard Lavilliers for Baron Samedi (Disques Barclay)
Julien Doré for LØVE (Columbia Records)
Vincent Delerme for Les Amants parallèles (Tôt ou tard)
Yodelice for Square Eyes (Mercury Records)

Literature
 Best novel or essay :
 La Cuisinière d'Himmler by Franz-Olivier Giesbert (éditions Gallimard)Au revoir là-haut by Pierre Lemaitre (published by Albin Michel)
Le Cas Édouard Einstein by Laurent Seksik (Flammarion)
L'Invention de nos vies by Karine Tuil (published by Grasset & Fasquelle)
Sulak by Philippe Jaenada (published by Julliard)

 Arts
 Best exhibit :
 Edward Hopper at the Grand PalaisFrida Kahlo / Diego Rivera, l'art en fusion at the Musée de l'Orangerie
Georges Braque at the Grand Palais
La Renaissance et le rêve at the Palais du Luxembourg
Roy Linchtenstein at the Centre Georges-Pompidou
 Best fashion designer :
 Isabel Marant Jean-Charles de Castelbajac
 Stephanie Renoma
 Maxime Simoëns
 Alexandre Vauthier

 2015 
The 10th edition of the awards ceremony took place on 13 April 2015 at the Lido in Paris. The ceremony was broadcast live on D17. It attracted 49,000 viewers in France (constituting 0.4% of the audience share).

 President of the Jury: Christine Kelly
 Hosts: Justine Fraoli and Bernard Montiel

Honorary Globe (Globe d'honneur)
Charlie Hebdo

Film/ Television
Best FilmTimbuktu by Abderrahmane Sissako
 Two Days, One Night by Jean-Pierre and Luc Dardenne
 Hippocrate by Thomas Lilti
 La Famille Bélier by Eric Lartigau
 Les Combattants by Thomas Cailley

Best TV movie or TV show
 Spiral (Season 5) — created by Alexandra Clert (Canal+)
 La Loi — created by Fanny Burdino, Mazarine Pingeot and Samuel Doux, directed by Christian Faure (France2)
 Mafiosa (Season 5) — created by Hugues Pagan and directed by Pierre Leccia (Canal+)
 P'tit Quinquin — created by Bruno Dumont (Arte)
 Résistance (Season 1) — created by Dan Franck, directed by David Delrieux and Miguel Courtois (TF1)

Best Actor
Pierre Niney — Yves Saint Laurent 
 François Damiens — La Famille Bélier 
 Gaspard Ulliel — Saint Laurent
 Guillaume Canet — Next Time I'll Aim for the Heart 
 Reda Kateb — Hippocrate

Best Actress
 Aïssa Maïga — Anything for Alice
 Adèle Haenel — Les Combattants
 Émilie Dequenne —  Not My Type 
 Marion Cotillard — Two Days, One Night
 Sandrine Kiberlain — Elle l'adore

Theatre
Best Play 
 Ouh Ouh — Isabelle Mergault and Daive Cohen, staging by Patrice Leconte (Théâtre des Variétés)
 La Colère du Tigre — by Philippe Madral, staging by Christophe Lidon (Théâtre Montparnasse)
 Lucrèce Borgia — based on the play by Victor Hugo, staging by Denis Podalydès (Comédie Française)
 Un dîner d'adieu — by Alexandre de La Patellière and Matthieu Delaporte, staging by Bernard Murat (Théâtre Edouard VII)
 Trahisons — by Harold Pinter, staging by Frédéric Bélier-Garcia (Théâtre du Vieux Colombier/Comédie Française)

Best Musical
 Les Parapluies de Cherbourg — by Jacques Demy, staging by Vincent Vittoz, musical direction by Michel Legrand (Théâtre du Châtelet)
 Le Bal des Vampires — by Michael Kunze and Jim Steinman, staging by Roman Polanski (Théâtre Mogador)
 Love Circus — by Agnès Boury and by Stéphane Laporte, staging by Stéphane Jarny (Folies Bergère)
 Mistinguett, reine des années folles — by Albert Cohen, Jacques Pessis and Ludovic-Alexandre Vidal, staging by François Chouquet (Casino de Paris)
 Un Américain à Paris —  adaptation and staging by Christopher Wheeldon (Théâtre du Châtelet)

Best One-Man-Show
 Nawell Madani — C'est moi la plus belge (Trianon)
 Alex Lutz — (Bobino)
 Florence Foresti — Madame Foresti (Théâtre du Chatelet)
 Gad Elmaleh — 20 ans sur scène (Palais des sports)
 Gaspard Proust — Gaspard Proust tapine (Théâtre de la Madeleine)

Best Actor
Éric Elmosnino — Un dîner d'adieu by Alexandre de La Patellière and Matthieu Delaporte, staging by Bernard Murat (Théâtre Edouard VII)
 Claude Brasseur — La Colère du Tigre by Philippe Madral, staging by Christophe Lidon (Théâtre Montparnasse)
 Francis Huster — Le Joueur d'échecs by Stefan Zweig, adaptation by Eric-Emmanuel Schmitt, staging Steve Suissa (Théâtre Rive Gauche)
 Grégory Gadebois — Des fleurs pour Algernon after the work by Daniel Keyes, adaptation by Gérald Sibleyras, staging by Anne Kessler (Théâtre Hébertot)
 Jacques Weber — Gustave by Arnaud Bedouët, staging by Jacques Weber (Théâtre de l'Atelier)

Best Actress
 Elsa Zylberstein —  Splendour by Géraldine Maillet, staging Catherine Schaub (Théâtre de Paris)
 Audrey Fleurot — Un dîner d'adieu by Alexandre de La Patellière and Matthieu Delaporte, staging by Bernard Murat (Théâtre Edouard VII)
 Béatrice Dalle — Lucrèce Borgia after the play by Victor Hugo, staging by David Bobée (Château de Grignan)
 Isabelle Adjani — Kinship by Carey Perloff, staging by Dominique Borg (Théâtre de Paris)
 Marie Gillain — La Vénus à la fourrure by David Ives, staging by Jérémie Lippmann (Théâtre Tristan Bernard)

Music
Best Female Performer
 Brigitte — À bouche que veux-tu (Columbia)
Carla Bruni — À l'Olympia (Barclay)
Christine and the Queens — Chaleur Humaine (Because Music)
Indila — Mini World (Capitol)
Zaz — Paris (Play On)

Best Male Performer
 Alain Souchon and Laurent Voulzy — Alain Souchon & Laurent Voulzy (Parlophone- Warner Music and Sony Music)
Black M — Les Yeux plus gros que le monde (Wati B)
Calogero — Les Feux d'artifice (Universal)
Johnny Hallyday — Rester Vivant (Warner Music)
Kendji Girac — Kendji (Mercury)

Literature
Best Novel or Essay
 Charlotte by David Foenkinos (Éditions Gallimard)
 La Petite communiste qui ne souriait jamais by Lola Lafon (Éditions Actes Sud)
 Le Chardonneret by Donna Tartt (Éditions Plon)
 Le Royaume by Emmanuel Carrère (P.O.L)
 Réparer les vivants by Maylis de Kerangal (Éditions Gallimard)

Arts
Best Exhibit 
Niki de Saint Phalle (Grand Palais)
Jeff Koons (Centre Pompidou)
Marcel Duchamp — La peinture même (Centre Pompidou)
Sonia Delaunay — Les couleurs de l'abstraction (Musée d'art moderne de la ville de Paris)
Hokusai (Grand Palais)

Best Fashion Designer 
Yiqing Yin
Alber Elbaz (Lanvin)
Sylvia Sermenghi (Legends Monaco)
Inès de La Fressange
Raf Simons (Dior)

References

External links 
 Official website 

French film awards
French theatre awards
French awards
Awards established in 2006
 *